Novokrayushkino is a rural locality (a selo) in Severny Selsoviet, Pervomaysky District, Altai Krai, Russia. The population was 327 as of 2013. There are 7 streets.

Geography 
Novokrayushkino is located 61 km north of Novoaltaysk (the district's administrative centre) by road. Severny is the nearest rural locality.

References 

Rural localities in Pervomaysky District, Altai Krai